Adam Gilchrist is a retired international Australian batsman and wicketkeeper.  He scored centuries (scores of 100 or more) 33 times in his career. And he scored centuries in both Test and One Day International (ODI) matches organised by the International Cricket Council (ICC).  Describing his batting philosophy simply as "just hit the ball", he has been called "one of the most destructive batsmen the sport has ever seen".

Selected for the Australian ODI side, Gilchrist made his debut in October 1996 against South Africa in the Titan Cup at Faridabad. His first century came in January 1998 against the same opponents, this time at the Sydney Cricket Ground (SCG). Opening the batting, he scored 100 runs from 104 deliveries, and led Australia to a seven-wicket victory. Gilchrist's third ODI century helped Australia to equal the world record for the highest ODI runchase, while his fourth, against Sri Lanka in 1999, helped Australia achieve the highest successful run chase in ODI history at the SCG at the time. His fifth ODI century, 154 against the same team later in the tournament, broke Dean Jones and Ricky Ponting's Australian record score of 145. Gilchrist's sixth ODI century, 128 from 98 deliveries against New Zealand, helped Australia on their way to their highest ever ODI total. He reached the milestone in 78 balls, equalling the Australian record of Allan Border for the fastest hundred in ODIs. As part of Gilchrist's eighth century, he and Ponting shared an Australian second-wicket record partnership of 225. He was named the Australian One-Day International Player of the Year in both 2003 and 2004. Gilchrist's highest score in ODI cricket is 172, achieved against Zimbabwe in January 2004. Gilchrist's century against the World XI came from 73 deliveries, breaking his own Australian record by five balls. He broke this mark again with his 14th century, reaching three figures in 67 balls. His penultimate ODI century was made in the 2007 Cricket World Cup final which also happened to be his only world cup century.  Scoring 149 runs from 104 deliveries, including eight sixes and thirteen fours, Gilchrist made the highest score and quickest century in the final of the World Cup. Australia won every ODI match in which Gilchrist scored a century, and he retired with 99 to his name, scoring at a rate of more than one run per delivery in 13 of them.

Gilchrist made his Test debut against Pakistan in November 1999, and scored his first international century in the second match of the series. Scoring an unbeaten 149 in the fourth innings of the match, he led Australia to a four-wicket victory in Hobart. This was the third highest successful runchase in Test history and the highest on Australian soil. His second Test century helped to extend Australia's world record streak of consecutive Test wins to 16. This came after the Australians fell to 5/99 in reply to India's total of 171, before Gilchrist scored 122 from 112 deliveries, featuring in a 197-run partnership with Matthew Hayden in 32 overs. His highest Test score, 204 not out, was made against South Africa at the New Wanderers Stadium, Johannesburg in February 2002. Featuring in a partnership of 317 with Damien Martyn, this was the fastest double century in Test history at the time, in terms of deliveries received. He followed this with 138 from 108 balls in the next match, and ended the three-Test series with 473 runs from 474 balls, at a batting average of 157.66. In the same year, he was named as one of the Wisden Cricketers of the Year. In 2006, he made the second-fastest century in Test history, hitting 100 from 57 balls, including three sixes in a single over against English bowler Monty Panesar. Usually batting at number seven in the Test side, Gilchrist scored centuries against all nine other Test nations.  By the time of his retirement from international cricket in January 2008, he had scored 17 Test centuries.

Key

Test centuries

One Day International centuries

References
Notes

Written references

External links

Gilchrist
Gilchrist, Adam